Estelle Cascino and Elixane Lechemia were the defending champions, but lost in the semifinals to Akgul Amanmuradova and Ekaterine Gorgodze.

Amanmuradova and Gorgodze went on to win the title, defeating Vivian Heisen and Yana Sizikova in the final, 7–6(7–2), 6–3.

Seeds

Draw

Draw

References
Main Draw

Engie Open Nantes Atlantique - Doubles
Open Nantes Atlantique